Dainis Upelnieks (born  1 October 1982) is a Latvian shooter. He represented his country at the 2016 Summer Olympics.

References

External links
 
 
 

1982 births
Living people
Latvian male sport shooters
Shooters at the 2016 Summer Olympics
Olympic shooters of Latvia
People from Bauska